The 1984 United States elections was held on November 6, and elected the members of the 99th United States Congress. Republicans won a landslide victory in the presidential election, picked up seats in the House of Representatives, and successfully defended their Senate majority.

Republican incumbent President Ronald Reagan won re-election, defeating Democratic former Vice President Walter Mondale. Reagan carried every state except for Washington, D.C., and Mondale's home state of Minnesota; won 58.8 percent of the popular vote; and defeated Mondale by a popular vote margin of eighteen points. Reagan remains the only presidential candidate since Richard Nixon in 1972 to win at least 55 percent of the popular vote and win by a margin greater than 10 points. 

Mondale defeated Colorado Senator Gary Hart and Reverend Jesse Jackson of Illinois to take the Democratic nomination. Mondale selected New York Congresswoman Geraldine Ferraro as his running mate, making Ferraro the first woman to appear on a major party presidential ticket.

Democrats picked up two Senate seats, bringing their total to 47 out of 100 seats. Democrats won the nationwide popular vote for the House of Representatives by a margin of 5.1 percentage points and retained their majority, though Republicans picked up a total of sixteen seats. The party makeup of both chambers of Congress following this election cycle, in which the Democrats had control of the House and the Republicans had control of the Senate, would not be emulated until 2018. In the gubernatorial elections, the Republicans won a net of one seat.

See also
1984 United States presidential election
1984 United States House of Representatives elections
1984 United States Senate elections
1984 United States gubernatorial elections

References

 
1984